Bahamian Creole, also described as the Bahamian dialect, is spoken by both white and black Bahamians, although in slightly different forms. Bahamian dialect also tends to be more prevalent in certain areas of the Bahamas.  Islands that were settled earlier or that have a historically large Afro-Bahamian population have a greater concentration of individuals exhibiting creolized speech; the dialect is most prevalent in urban areas. Individual speakers have command of lesser and greater dialect forms.

Bahamian dialect shares similar features with other Caribbean English-based creoles, such as those of Jamaica, Barbados, Trinidad and Tobago, Turks and Caicos, Saint Lucia, Grenada, St. Vincent and the Grenadines, Guyana, and the Virgin Islands. There is also a very significant link between Bahamian and the Gullah language of South Carolina, as many Bahamians are descendants of enslaved Black people brought to the islands from the Gullah region after the American Revolution.

In comparison to many of the English-based languages of the Caribbean region, limited research has been conducted on what is known as Bahamian English. This lack of research on Bahamian English is perhaps because for many years, Bahamians have assumed that this language is simply a variety of English. However, academic research shows that this is not the case. In fact, there is much socio-historical and linguistic evidence to support the proposal that it is a creole language.

Pronunciation
Though there is variation between black and white speakers, there is a tendency for speakers to drop  or, in a hypercorrection, to add it to words without it so harm and arm are pronounced the same. The merger occurs most often in the speech of Abaco and north Eleuthera.

Other characteristics of Bahamian Creole in comparison to English include:
Merger of the vowels of fair and fear into 
The vowel of first merges with that of fuss (into ) among some and with the vowel of foist (into ) in others.
As the creole is non-rhotic;  is not pronounced unless it is before a vowel. For example, "Hard" turns in to "Haad" with the "a" being lengthed in the absents of the rhotic. 
Final clusters are often simplified, especially when they share voicing (gold > gol, but not milk > *mil).
 The pin–pen merger occurs.

Grammar
Pronouns in Bahamianese are generally the same as in Standard English. However, the second person plural can take one of three forms:
yinna,
y'all or
all a ya

Possessive pronouns in Bahamianese often differ from Standard English with: 
your becoming or ya
his or hers becoming he or she
and
their becoming dey.
For example, das ya book? means 'is that your book?'

In addition, the possessive pronouns differ from Standard English:

                                                                   
When describing actions done alone or by a single group, only.. one is used, as in only me one sing ('I'm the only one who sang') and only Mary one gern Nassau ('Mary is the only one who is going to Nassau')

Verbs

Verb usage in the Bahamianese differs significantly from that of Standard English. There is also variation amongst speakers.  For example, the word go:

1) I'm going to Freeport: 
I goin ta Freeport
I gern ta Freeport
I gun go Freeport

2) I am going to cook
I ga cook
I goin cook
I gern cook
I gern go cook

Similarly, verb "to do" has numerous variations depending on tense and context: 
I does eat conch erry day ('I eat conch every day')
 Wa you does do? ('what kind of work do you do?')
 "He gone dat way" (used while pointing in a direction, means that is where the person went).

In the present tense, the verb "to be" is usually conjugated "is" regardless of the grammatical person:  
I am – I is or "Ise” (pronounced "eyes")
You are – You is or "You's", pronounced "use"
We are – We is or "We's", pronounced "weez"
They are – Dey is or "Dey's"

The negative form of "to be" usually takes the form "een" 
I een gern ('I am not goin')

While context is often used to indicate tense (e.g. I drink plenny rum las night = 'I drank a lot of rum last night'), the past tense can also be formed by combining "did", "done", "gone", or "been" with the verb:  
She tell him already ('she already told him')
I dun (done) tell you
He tell her she was fat  ('he told her she was fat')
Why you do dat? ('why did you do that?')
I bin (been) Eleuthera last week ('I went to Eleuthera last week')

Lexicon
 features over 5,500 words and phrases not found in Standard English, with the authors attempting to link them to other English-based creoles, like Gullah.  Words may derive from English, as well as some African languages.

Examples
: a cooperative savings system traced to a Yoruba custom of éèsú or èsúsú; similar schemes are common in other Caribbean countries, e.g. the susu in Barbados.
: sesame seed, grown locally and used in the popular treat   found in various forms throughout the African Diaspora.
 or : a white Bahamian.
,  or : to stab or poke, possibly from the West African word of the same meaning.  This word is found in many Caribbean creole languages
: Witchcraft.

See also 
 Gullah language
 Turks and Caicos Creole
 Jamaican Creole
 Haitian Creole, a French-based Creole spoken in the Bahamas by Haitian immigrants

References

Bibliography

External links
Bahamian English Resources

English-based pidgins and creoles
Languages of the Bahamas
Creoles of the Caribbean
English language in the Caribbean
Languages of the African diaspora